Bini Sang is a small village in about 15 km north of Ghazni Province, Afghanistan.

See also 
 Ghazni Province

References 

Villages in Afghanistan
Populated places in Ghazni Province
Hazarajat